Jacques Danois, pseudonym of Jacques Maricq (11 September 1927 – 20 September 2008), was a reporter and  writer  who was director of information at Unicef.

He was born in Brussels. Upon retirement, he became Secretary General, then Vice-President, of the World Association of Children's Friends. He died in Carpentras, Vaucluse, France.

Published works
 Un homme appelé Laurent, Pierre De Méyère, 1965
 Mon frère Bantu, Pierre De Méyère, 1966
 Envoyé special au Vietnam, Pierre De Méyère, 1968
 Les Moineaux de Saigon, (Photos Philippe Franchini), Jules Verbeek, 1969
 Le Sang du jasmin, Pierre De Méyère, 1973
 Au clair de la Terre, poèmes illustrés par Dom, Pierre De Méyère, 1973
 L'autocar Chinois, Pierre De Méyère, 1974
 La fleur de velours noir, Pierre De Méyère, 1975
 La Pierre habitée, (Illustré par Serge Creuz), Pierre De Méyère.
 Les Amis du bout du monde, Pierre De Méyère, 1976
 Vents du Nord, Prométhée, 1977
 Lali, Pierre De Méyère, 1978
 Mordre de la brume, Pierre De Méyère, 1978
 Regards brûlés, Saint-Germain-des-Près, 1978
 Défiance, (Illustré par Caroline Maricq), Erawan, 1980
 La rue des Algues, Pierre De Méyère, 1980
 L'Hôtel du Nouveau Nuage, (Illustré par Caroline Maricq), Pierre De Méyère, 1981
 La terre gourmande, RTL édition, 1986
 La nuit des chiens, RTL – La Palme (et fondation Jacques Brel), 1988
 Printemps blessés, Les Dossiers d'Aquitaine, 1990 
 Aguigui, Les Dossiers d'Aquitaine, 1991 
 Pourtant il ne neige pas, Les Dossiers d'Aquitaine, 1992 
 Moisson fragiles. Les enfants du docteur Hoa, Collection "Les Enfants du Fleuve", Éditions Fayard, 1994
 Passeport pour l'amitié, Collection "Les Enfants du Fleuve, Éditions Fayard, 1995
 Vietnam, un certain renouveau?, (Illustré par Caroline Maricq), Les Dossiers d'Aquitaine, 1996 
 Cicatrices, Les Dossiers d'Aquitaine, 1997 
 Han Suyin aux multiples splendeurs, Les Dossiers d'Aquitaine, 1998 
 Frères dans la rizière, Éditions Fayard, 1998
 Alcooloflash, Les Dossiers d'Aquitaine, 2000 
  Le désarroi de Confucius, Éditions Fayard, 2000 2000 
 Une récolte de lunes, Éditions du Jubilé, 2003
 Le Cahier, Les Dossiers d'Aquitaine, 2006 
 Jardin public, (théâtre), Les Dossiers d'Aquitaine, 2006 
 Eclats de mémoire, Les Dossiers d'Aquitaine, 2005 
 Rizières, savanes et garrigues, Les Dossiers d'Aquitaine, 
 L'ânesse blanche, Les Dossiers d'Aquitaine, 2006 
 Micro au poing, Patrick Robin, 2006 
 Tsunami sur l'enfance, Les Dossiers d'Aquitaine, 2007 
 Mes vieux camarades de Jésus, Les Dossiers d'Aquitaine, 2008

National Honours 
  :
 1999 : Officer of the Order of Leopold

Foreign Honours 
  : 
 2001 : Chevalier of the Order of Saint-Charles

References

External links
 The blog of Jacques Danois
 Amade Mondiale
 Association des Ecrivains Belges de Langue Française
 Les dossiers d'Aquitaine
 Le Choix des Libraires 
 Reporters sans frontières

Belgian non-fiction writers
Belgian male writers
1927 births
2008 deaths
Writers from Brussels
20th-century non-fiction writers
Male non-fiction writers